Möhrendorf is a town in the district of Erlangen-Höchstadt, in Bavaria, Germany. It lies on the river Regnitz and the Rhine-Main-Danube Canal.

References

Erlangen-Höchstadt